The Braybrook Sporting Club is an Australian rules football club which compete in the Western Region Football League  since 1931.
They are based in the Melbourne suburb of Braybrook. Their home ground is Pennell Reserve, at the corner of Burke and Cranwell Streets.

The club is not affiliated to the Essendon Football Club, but also adopts the black jumper with red sash as its primary jumper, with the reverse being utilised for jumper-clashes with similarly uniformed clubs.

Braybrook was relegated to Division 3 in 2014, when the competition split into 3 divisions from the previous 2. They remained in Division 3, despite winning the WRFL Division 3 Senior premiership in the 2014 season. The club persevered through a remarkable finals series in 2022, winning the premiership against the Wyndham Suns to see them elevated to Division 2 ahead of the 2023 season. 

The Braybrook Sporting Club is now home to Men's and Women's senior football teams, Auskick programs and several netball teams across both junior and senior levels.

The club has been home to several players who have gone on to be successful at higher levels, including George Bisset, Doug Hawkins, EJ Whitten and Brian Wilson.

History
Braybrook is a foundation member of the Western Region Football League (WRFL). One of the few original clubs still in the competition the club. The club's most recent senior premierships were won in 1990, 1993, 1997, 1999 and 2014.
The club currently holds the record in Australia for the club that has produced the most AFL players.

VFL/AFL players
Brian Wilson - Footscray, North Melbourne, Melbourne and St Kilda
Lyle Anderson - Footscray
 Ted Whitten - Footscray, 
Doug Hawkins - Footscray,  Fitzroy 
George Bisset - Footscray, 
Ray Walker - Footscray,
Robert Groenewegen - Footscray,
Albert Proud - 
Dennis Collins - Footscray, Carlton

Honours
 Western Region Football League
 Div 1 (12): 1942, 1944, 1945, 1946, 1952, 1954, 1955, 1956, 1973, 1974, 1975, 1979
 Div 2 (3): 1936, 1993, 1999
 Div 3 (4): 1990, 1997, 2014, 2022

Bibliography
 History of the WRFL/FDFL by Kevin Hillier – 
 History of football in Melbourne's north west by John Stoward –

References

External links

Official website

Australian rules football clubs in Melbourne
Australian rules football clubs established in 1874
1874 establishments in Australia
Western Region Football League clubs
Sport in the City of Maribyrnong